Carlile is an English habitational surname related to the city of Carlisle. Notable people with the surname include:

 Alex Carlile, Baron Carlile of Berriew, British politician
 Alipate Carlile, Australian Rules Football player
 Austin Carlile, lead singer for American metalcore band Of Mice & Men
 Brandi Carlile, American folk music singer/songwriter
 Forbes Carlile, Australian Olympic swimming coach
 Hildred Carlile, British politician
 John S. Carlile, American senator
 Richard Carlile, British free press and universal suffrage advocate
 Wilson Carlile, British evangelist who founded Church Army

See also 

Carlie
 Carlisle (surname)
 Carlyle (name)

References

English toponymic surnames